The Greeks in the Netherlands number between 4,000 and 12,500 people.

Religion
The first Greek Orthodox congregation in Amsterdam was founded by Metropolitan Gerasimos Avlonites.

Notable people

Nikos Vertis - singer
Stefania Liberakakis - singer
Mikaela Fotiadis - half Dutch Greek model 
Marios Lomis - soccer
Rosanna Georgiou - half Dutch supermodel
Janice Fronimakis - model
Σίλια Ευαγγέλου - half Dutch Greek model
I Mikri Ollandeza - half Dutch former model and youtuber, her name is Danae Georganta, (I Mikri Ollandeza) is the name of her youtube channel and it means (The Little Dutch Girl)

See also
 Greece–Netherlands relations

References

Bibliography

Further reading

External links 
  Greek Ministry of Foreign Affairs about relations with the Netherlands 
 Greek embassy in The Hague
 Greek Expats in the Netherlands

 
 
Ethnic groups in the Netherlands
Netherlands